Kalatpadai is a 2003 Tamil-language romantic drama film directed by J. Ramesh, making his directorial debut. The film stars newcomer Jai and Vidhya Venkatesh, with Radha Ravi, J. Livingston, Thalaivasal Vijay, Nithin Sathya, Rajsekhar, Jyothi, Thennavan and Kuyili playing supporting roles. It was released on 15 January 2003.

Plot

Ram (Jai) is a carefree and jobless young man who mostly hangs out with his seven friends. They spent much of their time smoking cigarettes and teasing everybody, with not much thought about their future. One day, Ram meets his best friend Sridhar (Arun) in his house and encounters his soft-spoken sister Priya (Vidhya Venkatesh). Thereafter, Ram comes across Priya on multiple occasions, they eventually fall in love with each other and ends up dating. Thus, he distances himself from his friends' outings. He even reveals his love to three of his friends. When Sridhar and his family find out about their love affair, they ask Priya to forget him straight away. Being from an orthodox Hindu Brahmin family, they could not accept because Ram was from another caste. Sridhar then has a fight with Ram for dating his sister and misusing his friendship. The group of friends split up into two groups: the first group supported Ram and knew about his love before, while the second one supported Sridhar and knows about his love just now. Sridhar even beats up his sister at home for dating his friend, and her family starts to be very strict with her. Later, Priya convinces Ram's friends to support their love. Ram and Priya had no other choice but to get married, in a hurry, at the registrar office with the help of Ram's parents and friends. After the secret marriage, Ram's father Janakiraman (Radha Ravi) advises him to first find a job and then they will start their married life. The two families then decide to settle the problem once and for all. The film ends with Ram and Priya getting married as per the customs and with the blessings of both families.

Cast

Jai as Ram
Vidhya Venkatesh as Priya
Radha Ravi as Janakiraman, Ram's father
Arun as Sridhar, Ram's friend
J. Livingston as "Cut" Raj
Thalaivasal Vijay as Deenadayalan
R. Sekar as Priya's father
Jyothi as Bhama, Priya's mother
Thennavan as Priya's uncle
Kuyili as Priya's aunt
Anthony as Daniel, Ram's friend
Vijayganesh as Ram's friend
Santhosh as Ram's friend
Amit Gupta as Ram's friend
Riyaz as Ram's friend
Sreeni as Ram's friend
John Paul as John Paul
Sampath Ram as Henchman

Production
After producing Thalaivasal (1992), Amaravathi (1993) and Sathi Sanam (1997), producer Chozha Ponnurangam of Chozha Creations took a long sabbatical from films. Chozha Ponnurangam launched his new film titled "Kalatpadai". A youthful story centring round eight friends, J. Ramesh, who had apprenticed under director Selva, was chosen to direct the film. Newcomer Jai, who had completed his pilot's training and was all set to work for an airlines, signed to play the hero. Vidhya Venkatesh, an air hostess, who had already played a role in Panchathantiram (2002), was selected to play the female lead role. The supporting cast has Arun (Nithin Sathya), Vijayganesh, Antony (of Naiyandi Durbar fame), Livingston, Radha Ravi, Rajsekhar, Kai Thennavan, Jyoti, Thalaivasal Vijay and Kuyili.

Soundtrack

The music was composed by Bharadwaj, with lyrics written by Kamakodiyan, Snehan, Newton and J. Ramesh.

Release
The film was originally planned to release in 29 November 2002 but was postponed to 15 January 2003 which coincided with the Thai Pongal festival. It opened alongside six other films, including Dhool, Chokka Thangam, Vaseegara, and Anbe Sivam.

Critical reception
Balaji Balasubramaniam of bbthots.com rated the film 2.5 out of 4 and stated, "The single factor that elevates this movie from mediocrity is the script. Almost everyone in the movie speaks sensibly and the dialogues sparkle with rare intelligence". S. R. Ashok Kumar of The Hindu gave the film a positive review citing that "credit must be given to director, J. Ramesh, who has written the story, for the screenplay and the artists for their performance. Ramesh's dialogue actually is the strength of the film" and that "both the new find Jai and Vidhu have given good accounts of themselves. They make a charming pair. The other new face Arun (Nithin Sathya) is promising". Malini Mannath said, "The director makes no pretensions of giving a great film, there are a couple of flaws in the narration too, but in totality it's a simple love story well told, that gives a good feeling in the end".

Box office
The film flopped at the box office.

References

2003 films
2000s Tamil-language films
2003 romantic drama films
Indian romantic drama films
Films scored by Bharadwaj (composer)
2003 directorial debut films